George Scarborough may refer to:

 George Scarborough (writer), 20th century lawyer, playwright, and author
 George Scarborough (cowboy), 19th century cowboy and lawman

See also
 George Scarbrough, poet who wrote about Appalachia